Benjamin Ide Wheeler (July 15, 1854– May 2, 1927) was a professor of Greek and comparative philology at Cornell University, writer, and President of the University of California from 1899 to 1919.

Life and career

Early years
Benjamin Ide Wheeler was born in Randolph, Massachusetts, on July 15, 1854, the son of the Rev. Benjamin and Mary Eliza (Ide) Wheeler. His father was successively a church pastor in Plaistow, New Hampshire; Pawtucket, Rhode Island; Randolph, Massachusetts; Haverhill, Massachusetts; Saco, Maine; Franklin, New Hampshire. His mother, Mary Eliza Ide, was born in Pawtucket, Rhode Island, daughter of Ebenezer Ide of the Ide family which had its origin in South Attleborough, then Rehoboth. Their only son, Benjamin Ide Wheeler, had his education first in the public schools of Haverhill and Saco, Maine. It was at Saco that he first entered a high school in 1866. This high school was the institution which formerly had been called Thornton Academy, and subsequently resumed that name.

Higher education
On moving in 1868 to Franklin, New Hampshire, he entered the Franklin Academy, and after six months there, went to the New London Academy, subsequently Colby–Sawyer College. From this school he was duly graduated in the summer of 1871. In the following autumn he entered Brown University from which he was graduated in 1875. His studies at college followed the usual curriculum without any suggestion of specialization. On the commencement stage he had the honour of the classical oration. During his college course he received the Dunn premium, given for the best work of the year in the department of English, with special reference to writing and speaking, and also one of the Carpenter prizes given to the two students of the year who in the opinion of the faculty combined in the highest degree the elements of success in life.

Teaching career
After graduation, Wheeler taught for four years in the Providence High School. During the first two years, he instructed mostly in mathematics; during the last two year, his work was evenly divided between classics and mathematics. In 1879, he was appointed Tutor in Brown University to take the place, during a temporary absence of two years, of Professor Poland, Assistant Professor in Greek and Latin.

Marriage
On June 25, 1881, Wheeler married Amey Webb of Providence, Rhode Island. She was the daughter of Henry Aborn Webb, a banker of Providence. Her mother, Amey Gorham Webb, was the daughter of Jabez Gorham founder of Gorham Silver, that became Gorham Silver Manufacturing Company after his son John Gorham took over.

Studies abroad
For four years, 1881–85,  Wheeler studied in German universities—for a year at Leipzig, then for two years at Heidelberg, a half year at Jena, and a half year at Berlin. In the spring of 1885, he received on examination at Heidelberg the degree of Doctor of Philosophy, summa cum laude, presenting a thesis under Hermann Osthoff entitled Der griechische Nominalaccent, afterwards published at Strassburg as a separate book. The thesis led to what is known as the law of dactylic retraction or "Wheelers Law". Joseph Wright, future Corpus Christi Professor of Comparative Philology at Oxford, completed his PhD the same year as Wheeler and also writing his thesis under Osthoff.

Return to America
On returning to America he was for one year Instructor at Harvard, 1885–86, then for thirteen years Professor at Cornell University, holding at first the title Acting Professor of Classical Philology, 1886–87, then of Professor of Comparative Philology 1887–88, and from 1888 to 1899 that of Professor of Greek and Comparative Philology. In 1899, he became President of the University of California.

During the year 1895–96, he was Professor of Greek Literature at the American School of Classical Studies in Athens, and during the year 1909–10, Roosevelt Professor at the University of Berlin. He was member of the American Oriental Society, the American Philological Association, and the Kaiserliches Archaeologisches Institut. He received the degree of Doctor of Laws from nine different universities, Princeton, 1896; Harvard, 1900; Brown, 1900; Yale, 1901; Johns Hopkins, 1902; University of Wisconsin, 1904; Dartmouth, 1905; Columbia, 1906; and a degree of Doctor of Letters from the University of Athens in Greece.

During the 1906 San Francisco earthquake and fire he was a member of Mayor Eugene Schmitz's Committee of Fifty.

During World War I his "well-known German sympathies and admiration for the kaiser" brought suspicion upon him and he retired as President of the University of California after the armistice. Wheeler had previously nominated the kaiser for the Nobel Peace Prize.

Under Wheeler the University of California underwent one of its periods of greatest growth.  He also expanded the powers of the president, gaining the power to appoint all faculty.

Legacy
 The University of California, Berkeley named Wheeler Hall in his honor.
 The Liberty ship SS Benjamin Ide Wheeler was named in his honor.
 The Benjamin Ide Wheeler Medal was created in 1929.
 Founding member of the Commonwealth Club of California in 1903.

Benjamin Ide Wheeler Medal
Since 1929, the award has been given to members of the community of Berkeley for exhibited outstanding contributions. Since 1994, the Berkeley Community Fund has been granting "Berkeley's Most Useful Citizen" award. Until 1991, it was bi-annual but changed to annual in 1994. Several notable people have received the award:

1929 William H. Waste
1931 August Vollmer
1933 Robert Gordon Sproul
1935 Chester R. Rowell
1937 William B. Herms
1939 Monroe E. Deutsch
1941 Louise Marks
1943 Lester W. Hink
1945 E.O. Lawrence
1947 Vere V. Loper
1949 Emery Stone
1951 Clarence A. Bullwinkel
1953 Galen M. Fisher 
1955 Walter A. Gordon
1957 Lilly M. Whitaker
1959 Robert R. Porter
1961 Redmond C. Staats, Jr.
1963 Claude B. Hutchison
1965 Katherine Towle
1967 Wallace J.S. Johnson
1969 Roger W. Heyns
1971 Wilmont Sweeny
1973 Carol Sibley
1975 Thomas B. Shaw
1977 Sylvia C. McLaughlin
1979 Robert W. Ratcliff
1981 Paul E. Harberts
1983 Robert G. Eaneman
1985 Robert A. Rice
1987 Margaret S. Gordon
1989 Fred S. Stripp
1991 Mary Lee Jefferds
1994 Ira Michael Heyman
1995 Alba and Bernard Witkin
1996 John A. Martin, Jr.
1997 Chang-Lin Tien
1998 David R. Brower
1999 Marian Cleeves Diamond
2000 Thelton E. Henderson
2001 Jeffrey Shattuck Leiter
2002 Alice Waters
2003 Kent Nagano
2004 Arthur Rosenfeld, Ph.D.
2005 Davida Coady, M.D.
2006 Mal Warwick
2007 Robert Cole
2008 Helen Meyer 
2008 John Meyer
2009 Steven H. Oliver
2010 Denny Abrams 
2010 Richard Millikan
2011 Narsai M. David
2012 Susan Medak
2013 Wavy Gravy
2014 Arlene Blum 
2015 Archana Horsting 
2016 Skip Battle 
2017 Vicki Alexander
2018 Susan Muscarella
2019 Frances Dinkelspiel, Lance Knobel and Tracey Taylor

Works
Wheeler authored Analogy in Language (1887); Introduction to the Study of the History of Language (1890); Organization of the Higher Education in the United States (1896), published in Munich; Dionysos and Immortality (1899); Life of Alexander the Great (1900); Instruction and Democracy in America (1910) (published in Strassburg, Germany).

Articles
A commencement address at the University of Michigan titled The old world in the new, an address delivered at the commencement exercises of the University of Michigan, June 30, 1898, was published in the August 1898 issue of The Atlantic and Art in Language was published in the December 1900 issue.

Publications
Der griechische Nominalaccent (1885)
Analogy, and the Scope of its Application in Language (1887)
Principles of Language Growth (1891)
Introduction to the Study of the History of Language (1891)
The Organization of Higher Education in the United States (1897)
Dionysos and Immortality (the Ingersoll Lecture for 1898)
Alexander the Great: The Merging of East and West in Universal History (1900)
The Whence and Whither of the Modern Science of Language (1905)

References

External links

 
Guide to the Benjamin Ide Wheeler Papers at The Bancroft Library
Three Faces of Berkeley--Competing Ideologies in the Wheeler Era, 1899-1919
Benjamin Ide Wheeler materials in the South Asian American Digital Archive (SAADA)
 

1854 births
1906 San Francisco earthquake
1927 deaths
Brown University alumni
Cornell University faculty
University of California regents
Leaders of the University of California, Berkeley
People from Randolph, Massachusetts
Educators from Massachusetts
People from San Francisco
Colby–Sawyer College alumni
Thornton Academy alumni